Mo'ed Katan or Mo'ed Qatan (Hebrew: מועד קטן, lit. "little festival") is the eleventh tractate of Seder Moed of the Mishnah and the Talmud. It is concerned with the laws of the days between the first and last days of Passover and Sukkot (as both of these festivals are a week in length). These days are also known as "Chol HaMoed" days. Mo'ed Katan also discusses the laws of Aveilus (Bereavement). Consisting of only three chapters, it has a Gemara from both Babylonian Talmud and the Jerusalem Talmud.

Summary
In the Babylonian Talmud:

The first 2 chapters deal with Chol HaMoed
The 3rd chapter deals primarily with the laws of mourning, as well as the laws of excommunication, and various accounts of the deaths of Amoraim.

Permitted Activities on Chol HaMoed
The Mishnah Berurah sums up the important principles that come out of Mo'ed Katan. In Mishnah Berurah 530:1 it lists the activities permitted on Chol HaMoed:
 Davar Ha'Aved- One may do work in order to avoid a loss (i.e. if the work is left to be done after Chol HaMoed, a loss will result)
 Tzarchei Moed- Even work which requires skill may be done if it is necessary for the purpose of eating on the Moed. For other activities, only work which does not require skill may done if it is necessary for Chol HaMoed.
 Bishvil Poel She'Ayn Lo Ma Yochal- If a person cannot afford to eat, it is permitted for them to work.
 Tzarchei Rabbim- Activities done for the benefit of the public may be done on Chol HaMoed
 Ma'aseh Hedyot- Unskilled work

External links
 Mishnah Mo'ed Katan text in Hebrew
 Full Hebrew and English text of the Mishnah for tractate Mo'ed Katan on Sefaria
Full Hebrew and English text of the Talmud Bavli for tractate Mo'ed Katan on Sefaria
Full Hebrew text of the Talmud Yerushalmi for tractate Mo'ed Katan on Sefaria
Full Hebrew and English text of the Tosefta for tractate Mo'ed Katan on Sefaria